

The I.P.D BF-1 Beija-Flôr (English: Humming Bird) was a two-seat light helicopter designed by Henrich Focke.

Design and development
The BF-1 was built by the aircraft department of the Brazilian Research and Development Institute (IPD) (formerly the CTA - Centro Técnico Aeroespacial), using a design of Henrich Focke. It was a conventional three-bladed single rotor helicopter, powered by a  Continental E225 piston engine, mounted in the nose. The tail unit included a small vertical dorsal fin with a horizontal stabilizer on the starboard side. Two inter-meshing tail rotors, each inclined at 45°, provided pitch and yaw control.

Operational history
Three prototypes were built, the first flying on 1 January 1959, but the type did not enter production.

Specifications

See also

References

 The Illustrated Encyclopedia of Aircraft Part Work 1982-1985). London: Orbis Publishing, 1985.

1950s Brazilian civil utility aircraft
1950s Brazilian helicopters
Aircraft first flown in 1959
Single-engined piston helicopters